The Intransigent Radical Civic Union (UCRI) was a political party of Argentina.

The UCRI developed from the centrist Radical Civic Union in 1956, following a split at the party's convention in Tucumán.

Receiving the endorsement of the exiled populist leader, Juan Perón four days before the February 1958 general elections, UCRI Presidential candidate Arturo Frondizi defeated the more conservative People's UCR by 17% and the party enjoyed a narrow majority in Congress. Following President Frondizi's forced resignation at the hands of the military, who objected to his political concessions towards Peronism and his close relations with Cuba, the UCRI President of the Senate, José María Guido, was appointed President of Argentina. A proposed Popular Front uniting banned Peronists, the UCRI and others dissolved ahead of the July 1963 general elections, when Buenos Aires Province Governor Oscar Alende developed objections to the inclusion of conservatives in the alliance. Frondizi, others in the UCRI and Perón instructed their supporters to cast blank ballots, leading to their highest incidence in the history of Argentine national elections. Governor Alende ran on the Intransigent Party, but was unable to overcome the boycott, leading him to narrowly lose to People's UCR candidate Arturo Illia, a centrist. Frondizi and his chief economist while in office, Rogelio Julio Frigerio, left the UCRI in August to establish the Integration and Development Movement (MID), whose platform centered on economic growth. The last affiliates of the UCRI joined the MID in 1972.

See also
List of political parties in Argentina

References

Todo Argentina 

Defunct political parties in Argentina
Radical Civic Union
Political parties established in 1956
1956 establishments in Argentina
Political parties disestablished in 1972
1972 disestablishments in Argentina